Charles Pierre Victor Delaporte (21 July 1880 – 1 May 1949) was a French rower and cyclist.

Delaporte was born in 1880. He competed in the men's single sculls event at the 1900 Summer Olympics. Delaporte competed at the 1906 Intercalated Games in Athens with the men's coxed four where they won silver. In the men's coxed pair (1 km) he won a bronze medal. In the 1 mile event for coxed pairs, he finished outside of the medals. He also competed in cycling (sprint) at the Intercalated Games and placed outside the medals.

At the 1906 European Rowing Championships, he won a silver medal with the men's eight.

References

External links
 

1880 births
1949 deaths
French male rowers
Olympic rowers of France
Rowers at the 1900 Summer Olympics
Rowers from Paris
Rowers at the 1906 Intercalated Games
Cyclists at the 1906 Intercalated Games
European Rowing Championships medalists